Justice Yakubu Itua (October 9, 1941 – August 8, 2006) was a Nigerian jurist and formal member of the federal House of Representatives in 1983. He was appointed a judge in the Edo state judiciary in 1999, by the then military governor of Edo state, Navy Captain Anthony Onyearugbulem with recommendation by the National Judiciary commission.

Early life and education 
Itua was born in Ewu a small town in Esan Central local government area of present-day Edo state. He attended St Patric's college Asaba Delta state.
for his secondary school education. He briefly worked with the Nigerian Institute Of Oil Palm Research Benin.

Career 
Itua later joined the Nigeria Customs Service, but was later dismissed. Justice Itua enrolled and got admission into the university of Lagos in
1968 and graduated. Itua was called to the bar and established his own law firm Itua and co at no 47 new lagos road Benin City. Itua went into-active politics and contested for a seat of the federal house of representative in which he won in 1983. His membership was short lived after the military government under Muhammadu Buhari took over power and suspended the Nigeria constitution.

Itua returned to his legal profession, where he established his own law firm Y Itua and co. He was legal adviser to various companies and organisations
in Edo state and other parts of Nigeria.

Death 
Itua died on 8 August 2006 of cardiac arrest at the University of Benin teaching hospital.

1941 births
2006 deaths
Nigerian jurists